Diatribes is the sixth studio album by English grindcore band Napalm Death, originally released in 1996 on Earache Records. It was released as double 10" vinyl, regular CD, special digipak CD with space for the Greed Killing EP and MC. In 2010, Earache issued a re-release of Diatribes in a box set that also included the Greed Killing EP and the live album Bootlegged in Japan.

Track listing

Personnel

Napalm Death
 Mark "Barney" Greenway – lead vocals
 Jesse Pintado – lead guitar
 Mitch Harris – rhythm guitar
 Shane Embury – bass, backing vocals
 Danny Herrera – drums

Technical personnel
 Colin Richardson – production
 Danny Sprigg – engineering
 Paul Siddens – assistant engineering
 Emma Siddens – assistant engineering
 Noel Summerville – mastering

Chart positions

References

Napalm Death albums
1996 albums
Earache Records albums